If You Ain't Lovin' You Ain't Livin' is the eighth studio album by American country music artist George Strait, released on February 22, 1988 by MCA Records. It is certified platinum by the RIAA and it produced three singles for Strait on the Hot Country Songs charts: the title track (originally recorded by Faron Young), "Baby Blue", and "Famous Last Words of a Fool" (originally recorded by Dean Dillon), all of which reached Number One.

Track listing

Personnel
George Strait – lead vocals
Curtis "Mr. Harmony" Young – background vocals
 Liana "Mrs. Harmony" Young – background vocals
Eddie Bayers – drums
David Hungate – bass
Reggie Young – electric guitar
Billy Joe Walker Jr. – electric guitar, acoustic guitar
Pat Flynn – acoustic guitar
Paul Franklin – steel guitar, dobro
Johnny Gimble – fiddle
Floyd Domino – piano

Production
Bob Bullock – engineer
Willie Peaver – engineer
Tim Kish – engineer
John Guess – mixer
Marty Williams – engineer
Russ Martin – engineer
Milan Bogdan – digital editing
Jessie Noble – project coordinator
Simon Levy – art direction
Mickey Braithwaite – design
Rick Henson – photography

Chart positions

References

1988 albums
George Strait albums
MCA Records albums
Albums produced by Jimmy Bowen